Dina Pathak (née Gandhi; 4 March 1922 – 11 October 2002) was an Indian actress and director of Gujarati theatre and also a film actor. She was an activist and President of the National Federation of Indian Women (NFIW).

A doyenne of Hindi and Gujarati films as well as theatre, Dina Pathak acted in over 120 films in a career spanning over six decades. Her production Mena Gurjari in Bhavai folk theatre style, ran successfully for many years, and is now a part of its repertoire.

She is best known for her memorable roles in the Hindi films Gol Maal and Khubsoorat. She was a favourite of the Art Cinema in India where she played powerful roles in films like Koshish, Umrao Jaan, Mirch Masala and Mohan Joshi Hazir Ho!.

Her notable Gujarati films were Moti Ba, Malela Jeev and Bhavni Bhavai, while her well-known plays include Dinglegar, Doll's House, Vijan Sheni and Girish Karnad's Hayavadana, directed by Satyadev Dubey.

Early life
Dina Pathak was born in Amreli, Gujarat on 4 March 1922. She was enamoured of fashion and films, and while a teenager, started acting in plays and won acclaim from critics. She attended and graduated from a college affiliated to the University of Bombay (Mumbai). Rasiklal Parikh trained her in acting while Shanti Bardhan taught her dancing.

At a young age, she joined the Indian National Theatre as an actress. She became known for her student activism, where Bhavai theatre, a folk theatre form from Gujarat, was used extensively to create awareness about the British rule, in the pre-independence era; this led to her close association with Indian People's Theatre Association (IPTA), along with her elder sister Shanta Gandhi and younger sister Tarla Mehta; while in Mumbai, she had an important hand in reviving the Gujarati theatre there, along with fellow Gujarati actors like Kailash Pandya and Damini Mehta.

Career
She created quite a stir with her plays in Gujarat in the 1940s. The audience queued up to watch her play the lead in Maina Gurjari, which is still one of the most popular Bhavai's along with sister Shanta Gandhi's Jasma Odhan. In 1957, when she performed Mena Gurjari in front of then-President, Dr. Rajendra Prasad at the Rashtrapati Bhawan in Delhi, it became the first and the only Gujarati play to have achieved the feat so far.

Although she made her film debut with a Gujarati film, Kariyawar (1948), she retreated back into theatre after acting in just one film.  She continued playing to packed audience in plays by Indian People's Theatre Association (IPTA) and Shanti Bardhan's Ballet troupe. Later she formed her own theatre group in Ahmedabad called "Natmandal", even today, she is remembered as a stalwart performer and a theatre activist at IPTA.

In her mid-40's, she made a comeback into films, two decades after her debut, with Basu Bhattacharya's Uski Kahani (1966), for which she won the Bengal Journalists Association Award. She made four films in the 1960s, including Hrishikesh Mukherjee's classic Satyakam (1969), Saat Hindustani (1969), starring Amitabh Bachchan in his debut role and the Merchant Ivory Productions, The Guru (1969). By the 1970s, she had become a favourite of art and commercial films alike, playing powerful motherly and grandmotherly roles. It was in these films that she became recognised as the Grand-Old-Mother of Hindi films. 

Films that stand out in this era are Gulzar's Mausam (1975), Kinara (1977) and Kitaab (1977), and sweet comedies like Basu Chatterjee's Chitchor (1976), Gharaonda (1977) and also in an art cinema classic, Shyam Benegal's Bhumika (1977), which saw her standing tall alongside another acting legend, Smita Patil, in her career's best performance.
 
Just as the 1970s ended, she was seen in the comedy classic, Hrishikesh Mukherjee's Gol Maal (1979), where she essayed the role of Kamala Shrivastava, a middle-aged woman who sportingly plays mother to Amol Palekar, who went on to direct her in his 1985 film, Ankahee. The next decade began with another career-best, as a stern disciplinarian matriarch in Hrishikesh Mukherjee's Khoobsurat in (1980), closely followed by Bhavni Bhavai (1980). In 1980, she was also awarded the Sangeet Natak Akademi Award. During the 80s, she also appeared on the popular TV series, Malgudi Days. In 1984, she appeared in A Passage to India. Though she had far from given her career's best, she gave another powerful performance in Ketan Mehta's Mirch Masala (1985), Govind Nihalani's Tamas (1986) and once again she worked with Gulzar in Ijaazat (1987). 

Perhaps her career's best came in another comedy when in 2002 she appeared in Deepa Mehta's Bollywood/Hollywood for which she was nominated for Best Performance by an Actress in a Supporting Role at the 23rd Genie Awards. She was also portraying the role of Badi Maa in the cult show Khichadi (2002).

Personal life
She married Baldev Pathak and had two daughters, actresses Ratna Pathak (b. 1957), and Supriya Pathak (b. 1961).

Death
She completed her last film, Pinjar (2003), but died before its release, of heart attack, following a prolonged illness, on 11 October 2002 in Bandra, Bombay.

Selected filmography

 Kariyawar (1948) - Raju
 Uski Kahani (1966)
 The Guru (1969) - Jury member at U.P. Beauty Contest
 Saat Hindustani (1969) - Mrs. J. Nath
 Satyakam (1969) - Harbhajan's mother
 Sara Akash (1969) - Mrs. Thakur
 Holi Ayee Re (1970) - Jamuna
 Sachaa Jhutha (1970) - Insp Pradhan's Mother
 Devi (1970) - Dharam Das' Sister
 Jal Bin Machhli Nritya Bin Bijli (1971) - Rajmata
 Koshish (1972) - Durga (Aarti's Mother)
 Ranak Devi (1973)
 Aap Ki Kasam (1974) - Sunita's Mother
 Avishkaar (1974)
 Charitraheen (1974)
 Mrig Trishna (1975) - Sandhya's maid
Anari (1975)
 Chaitali (1975) - Chaitali's Aunt
 Mausam (1975) - Gangu Rani
 Sangat (1976)
 Lagaam (1976) - Bheema's mother
 Chitchor (1976) - Mrs. P. Choudhry
 Gher Gher Matina Chula (1977)
 Dream Girl (1977) - Ratnabai
 Bhumika (1977) - Mrs. Kale
 Vishwasghaat (1977) - Saroj
 Shankar Hussain (1977) - Gomti
 Paheli (1977) - Masterji's wife
 Kitaab (1977) - Babla's Mother
 Kinara (1977)
 Gharaonda (1977) - Guha's Mother
 Anurodh (1977) - Sushma Choudhary
 Aadmi Sadak Ka (1977) - Owner of Francis Hotel
 Badalte Rishtey (1978) - Mrs. Thakur
 Damaad (1978) - Mrs. Choudhary
 Bhookh (1978) - Mausi
 Nari Tu Narayani (1978)
 Chakravyuha (1978)
 Jeena Yahan (1979)
 Do Ladke Dono Kadke (1979) - Shantu (Ramu & Rani's mom)
 Gol Maal (1979) - Kamala Srivastav 
 Meera (1979) - Mrs. Virendev Rathod 'Kunwarbai'
 Khandaan (1979) - Usha's mother
 Ahsaas (1979) - Anu Choudhury
 Solva Sawan (1979)
 Bebus (1979)
 Khubsoorat (1980) - Nirmala Gupta
 Thodisi Bewafaii (1980) - Dr. Karuna's mom
 Humkadam (1980) - Mrs. Raghunath Gupta
 The Naxalites (1980)
 Saajan Mere Main Saajan Ki (1980)
 Bhavni Bhavai (1980) - Bhagat's wife
 Naram Garam (1981) - Bhavani's mother-in-law
 Biwi-O-Biwi (1981) - Col. Mangal Singh's mother
 Haqdaar (1981)
 Shama (1981) - Mehrunisa 'Poofi'
 Aapas Ki Baat (1981) - Mrs. Sinha
 Umrao Jaan (1981) - Husseini
 Sharada (1981) - Taradevi
 Sansani: The Sensation (1981) - Wilma Vaz
 Tumhare Bina (1982) - Nani (Seema's mom)
 Dil-E-Nadaan (1982) - Vikram's Mother
 Dil... Akhir Dil Hai (1982) - Shobha Desai
 Prem Rog (1982) - Radha's Mother-In-Law (uncredited)
 Lakshmi (1982) - Thakur-Vijay's Father
 Star (1982) - Mrs. Verma
 Yeh To Kamaal Ho Gaya (1982) - Durga Singh
 Arth (1982) - Kavita's Mother
 Vijeta (1982) - Angad's grandmother (Biji)
 Bheegi Palkein (1982) - Mrs. Acharya
 Arpan (1983) - Mrs. Verma
 Prem Tapasya (1983) - Naniji (Grandmother)
 Woh Saat Din (1983) - Savitri (Anand's Mom)
 Achha Bura (1983) - Rosy
 Sasural (1984)
 Bindiya Chamkegi (1984) - Jeevan's wife
 Asha Jyoti (1984) - Mangala
 Yaadgaar (1984) - Suresh's mom
 A Passage to India (1984) - Begum Hamidullah
 Yahan Wahan (1984) - Rajesh's Mother
 Sharara (1984)
 Rakta Bandhan (1984) - Chandan's mom
 Mohan Joshi Hazir Ho! (1984)
 Meetha Zehar (1985)
 Holi (1985)
 Ramkali (1985) - Ramkali's foster mom
 Balidaan (1985) - Vijay's Bua
 Sur Sangam (1985) - Kannu's Grandmother
 Jhoothi (1985) - Seema's mother
 Ankahee (1985) - Savitri Chaturvedi
 Shart (1986) - Jankibai
 Andheri Raat Mein Diya Tere Haath Mein (1986) - Mai
 Karamdaata (1986) - Govinda's mother
 Ek Chadar Maili Si (1986) - Jindhi
 Naache Mayuri (1986) - Mayuri's Grandmother
 Haathon Ki Lakeeren (1986) - Geeta's mom
 Ek Pal (1986) - Priyam's mother
 Angaaray (1986) - Vijay's mother
 Mirch Masala (1987) - Maanki, factory worker
 Raahee (1987) - Mrs. Kumar
 Ijaazat (1987)
 Mera Yaar Mera Dushman (1987) - Ashok's Mother
 Aulad (1987) - Savithri
 Anjaam khuda jaane (1988)
 Mohabbat Ke Dushman (1988) - Amijaan
 Yateem (1988) - Mrs. Yadav (uncredited)
 Tamas (1988, TV Series)
 Lathi (1988)
 Clerk (1989) - Kaushalya
 Hum Intezaar Karenge (1989) - Ravi's mother
 Kasam Jhoot Ki (1990)
 Sanam Bewafa (1991) - Fateh's Mom
 Khilaaf (1991) - Mrs. Singh
 Saudagar (1991) - Bir Singh's elder sister
 Pita (1991)
 Ghar Parivaar (1991)
 Antarnaad (1991)
 Kabhi Dhoop Kabhi Chhaon (1992)
 Yaad Rakhegi Duniya (1992) - Naina's paternal grandmother
 Aaj Ka Goonda Raaj (1992) - Grandmother
 Sunday (1993)
 Aaina (1993) - Grandmother
 Chor Aur Chaand (1993) - Dinkar's mom
 Phool (1993) - Dharamraaj's mom
 Meharbaan (1993)
 Jaagruti (1993) - Jugnu's Grandmother
 Aankhen (1993) - Grandmother
 Andaz (1994) - Dadi in Photo Frame 
 Raja Babu (1994) - Bansi's Mother (uncredited)
 Eena Meena Deeka (1994) - Eena's mom
 Maidan-E-Jung (1995) - Buaji
 Zakhmi Sipahi (1995) - Shakti's Grandmother
 Sabse Bada Khiladi (1995) - Jamna's mom
 Yaraana (1995) - Durga
 Tarpan (1995) - Rammo
 Dushmani: A Violent Love Story (1995) - Buaji (Singh family)
 Yash (1996) - Daadima
 Aurat Aurat Aurat (1996) - Sita's chachi
 Mere Sapno Ki Rani (1997) - Rajnath's mom
 Pardes (1997) - Dadi Maa
 Zor: Never Underestimate the Force (1998) - Mrs. Singh
 Gharwali Baharwali (1998) - Dadi Maa
 Zulm-O-Sitam (1998) - Meena's Grandfather
 Himmatwala (1998)
 Silsila Hai Pyar Ka (1999) - Abhay's Grandmother
 Kartoos (1999) - Mini's Buaji
 Pyaar Koi Khel Nahin (1999)
 Badal (2000) - old lady
 Raja Ko Rani Se Pyar Ho Gaya (2000) - Dodima
 Champion (2000) - Rajveer's Grandmother
 Aashiq (2001) - Dai Maa
 Tum Bin (2001) - Mrs. Shah
 Lajja (2001) - Bua
 Devdas (2002) - Badima
 Bollywood/Hollywood (2002) - Grandma ji
 Mere Yaar Ki Shaadi Hai (2002)
 Border Hindustan Ka (2003) - 'Dadi' - Nargis' grandmother
 Pinjar (2003) - Rahim's aunt (final film role)

Television

Awards
 1977 – Nominated, Filmfare Award for Best Supporting Actress for Mausam
 1980 – Nominated, Filmfare Award for Best Supporting Actress for Gol Maal
 1981 – Nominated, Filmfare Award for Best Supporting Actress for Khubsoorat
 2003 – Nominated, Genie Award for Best Performance by an Actress in a Supporting Role for Bollywood/Hollywood

Notes

References

External links
 
 
 Dina Pathal filmography at New York Times
List of Filmfare Award Winners and Nominations, 1953–2005

1922 births
2002 deaths
People from Amreli district
Gujarati people
Actresses in Gujarati cinema
Indian women activists
Indian stage actresses
20th-century Indian actresses
Indian People's Theatre Association people
Actresses in Hindi cinema
Indian theatre directors
Gujarati theatre
21st-century Indian actresses
Indian women's rights activists
Activists from Gujarat
Indian women theatre directors
Recipients of the Sangeet Natak Akademi Award
Communist Party of India politicians from Gujarat
Female politicians of the Communist Party of India